Abiskomyia is a genus of European non-biting midges in the subfamily Orthocladiinae of the bloodworm family (Chironomidae).

Species
A. paravirgo Goetghebuer, 1940
A. virgo Edwards, 1937

References 

Chironomidae
Nematocera genera